Usino Rural LLG is a local-level government (LLG) of Madang Province, Papua New Guinea.

Wards
01. Bumbu (Mari language speakers)
06. Sankain (Mari language speakers)
07. Dumpu (Watiwa language speakers)
08. Kesawai
09. Aliveti
10. Koropa
11. Sausi
12. Korona
13. Yakumbu
14. Walium
15. Kuragina
16. Waput (Danaru language speakers)
17. Puksak
18. Naru
19. Somau
20. Mopo
21. Animinik
22. Negeri
23. Begesin
24. Koinegur
25. Baisop
26. Kunduk
27. Eunime
28. Komas
29. Igoi
30. Usino Station
31. Boko
32. Garaligut (Aisi language speakers)
33. Musak (Aisi language speakers)
34. Kukapang
83. Ramu Sugar Urban

References

Local-level governments of Madang Province